Shatruvu may refer to:
 Sathruvu, a 1991 Indian Telugu-language crime thriller film
 Shatruvu (2013 film), an Indian Telugu-language thriller film